"Whoomp! (There It Is)" is the debut single by 1990s rap duo Tag Team, written by members Cecil "DC the Brain Supreme" Glenn and Steve "Rolln" Gibson. The song reached No. 1 on the Billboard Hot R&B chart and No. 2 on the Billboard Hot 100 chart in 1993. "Whoomp!" reached multi-platinum status and broke records for the number of consecutive weeks in the top 10. Though Tag Team is considered a one-hit wonder, as their subsequent singles did not find the same success, "Whoomp!" has remained a pop culture staple with multiple placements in film, television, and advertisements. The song has also endured as a mainstay at sporting and arena events.

Background
Tag Team recorded "Whoomp! (There It Is)" in August 1992. At that time, Glenn was working as the main DJ at Magic City, an Atlanta gentlemen's club that would later become recognized as a hub of Atlanta hip-hop and rap music. The song sampled a  synthesizer line from the 1980 Italo disco hit "I'm Ready" by Kano. Glenn played the track in the club on the same day it was mixed and received a positive reaction from the audience. In the following months, people requested the song so often that it became clear the song had the potential to become a hit. The single was shopped to and rejected by multiple record labels because executives were unfamiliar with southern bass and were unsure if the sound would sell well around the country. Glenn instead borrowed $2,500 from his parents to press eight hundred records. The singles quickly sold out in Atlanta on word of mouth alone.

A representative from Mercury Records suggested that the best person to promote music from the southern bass genre was one-time Stax Records mogul Al Bell, head of Bellmark Records. Glenn reached out to Bell, who agreed to sign Tag Team without even hearing the song. Bell reportedly told Glenn, "I don’t need to hear the record. I hear it in your spirit."

A similar song, "Whoot, There It Is", was released by the Miami-based group 95 South a month prior to Tag Team's "Whoomp!" Both groups' record companies maintained that the similarities were a coincidence, as the phrase, "Whoomp (or whoot), there it is", was a common expression used by dancers in Atlanta and Miami nightclubs that members from both groups frequented. Arsenio Hall hosted both groups on his television show to perform their versions of the songs and let viewers vote on their favorite by calling a 900 number to donate money to the relief effort for the 1993 Midwest floods.

The phrase "Whoomp! There it is!" has come to mean something similar to "Look at that!". It is intended to encourage "positive partying". Tag Team has explained that the phrase refers to "anything that one agrees with on a positive level."

Reception
The song was praised by critics for its positive and uplifting tone. Within months of its release, "Whoomp!" reached the top position on the Billboard Hot R&B/Hip-Hop chart. The record held the #2 spot on the Hot 100 for seven consecutive weeks and reached platinum status. In February 1994, it received its fourth platinum certification.

"Whoomp! (There It Is)" received an award in the category for "Best Rap 12-inch" at the 1994 WMC International Dance Music Awards in the US. It was rated #97 in VH1's 100 Greatest One-Hit Wonders. The song is listed at #58 on "Billboards Greatest Songs of all time". "Whoomp"  has been called "da bomb party song" of the 1990s by Atlanta magazine and "among the country's most commercially successful singles of all time."

Music video
The video for the song features a large outdoor party. It was filmed at an Atlanta fairground and shows the duo riding a carousel. Extras were recruited by word-of-mouth and also by an announcement on a local radio station. More than a thousand extras showed up for the shoot.

Charts
The hit song spent one week at #1 on the US R&B chart in 1993. On the Hot 100 chart dated July 10, "Whoomp! (There It Is)" reached a new peak at number two, sandwiched between Janet Jackson's "That's the Way Love Goes" above and UB40's "Can't Help Falling in Love" beneath - all three songs ended up next to each other at the Year-End edition of the chart, occupying exactly the same positions, albeit in slightly different orders. It eventually spent seven weeks at #2 in September through October, 1993 on the Billboard Hot 100, but was kept out of the top slot by "Can't Help Falling in Love" and Mariah Carey's "Dreamlover". The single is certified 4× Platinum in the US for shipments of over 4,000,000 copies and, despite never reaching number one on the pop chart, the song spent 24 non-consecutive weeks in the top ten  becoming the longest running top ten song of all time until Toni Braxton’s “Un-Break My Heart” spent a week longer in 1997. It was ranked the second biggest song of 1993, behind Whitney Houston's "I Will Always Love You". It has sold over 3.5 million copies in the United States.

Weekly charts

Year-end charts

End of decade charts

Addams Family Values remix
Within a year of the release of "Whoomp! (There It Is)", Tag Team remixed the backing music with a version of the theme song from the original Addams Family television series to create the song "Addams Family (Whoomp!)" for the film Addams Family Values. Actors Christina Ricci and Jimmy Workman reprised their film roles as Wednesday Addams and Pugsley Addams (respectively) for the song's music video. This version appears as the closing track on the soundtrack album. "Addams Family (Whoomp!)" won the 1994 Razzie Award (Worst Original Song) for its writers (Ralph Sall, Stephen Gibson and Cecil Glenn).

Popular culture
"Whoomp! (There It Is)" has been played or referenced in dozens of films, TV shows, and advertisements. Some of the song's most notable placements in film include Elf, D2: The Mighty Ducks, Rio, and Addams Family Values. The song is also referenced in episode titles of Martin, The Fresh Prince of Bel-Air, and The Secret Life of the American Teenager. It is also widely considered one of the top songs of all time for sporting events and has been included among MLB's top walk-up songs and the NBA's biggest arena anthems.

More recently, a variant of the lyric was created by Vancouver Canucks fans to laud the popularity of the (at the time) recently-hired coach Bruce Boudreau, with a "Bruce, there it is!" chant during hockey games, beginning in December 2021.

Other versions

Clock version

In 1995, British pop/dance act Clock released a successful Eurodance cover of the song titled "Whoomph! (There It Is)". It was their fifth single from the debut album, It's Time..., and peaked at No. 5 in Ireland, No. 4 in the United Kingdom, No. 14 in Finland, No. 36 in Sweden and No. 96 in Australia.

Track listing
 CD single, UK (1995)
 "Whoomph! (There It Is)" (Short Stab) — 3:33
 "Whoomph! (There It Is)" (Clock GMT Mix) — 5:02
 "Whoomph! (There It Is)" (Time Gents Please) — 5:03
 "Whoomph! (There It Is)" (Clock 10 To 2 Mix) — 5:09
 "Whoomph! (There It Is)" (GMT Dub) — 5:01
 "Whoomph! (There It Is)" (The Visa Treatment) — 5:01

Charts

BM Dubs version
In 2001, UK garage producer BM Dubs (Andrew Kirby) released a version credited as BM Dubs presents Mr. Rumble featuring Brasstooth and Kee. It is based on Mr. Rumble's "Whoops.... We'll Be in Trouble!" from 2000, in which this version directly samples the vocals from Tag Team's "Whoomp! (There It Is)", whereas BM Dubs' 2001 version is a cover with vocals by Kee. It samples the Timo Maas remix of "Dooms Night" by Azzido Da Bass and reached No. 32 on the UK Singles Chart and No. 4 on the UK Dance Singles Chart in March 2001.

GEICO spot
In December 2020, the GEICO insurance company used a parody of "Whoomp! (There It Is)" and the members of Tag Team as the punchline to a joke in a commercial. It featured Glenn and Gibson replacing the lyrics of the song with lyrics about ice cream, turning the lyric to "Scoop! (There It Is)". While the song had been used in advertisements previously, this was the first time the members appeared in a spot.

See also
 List of number-one R&B singles of 1993 (U.S.)

References

1992 songs
1993 debut singles
1995 singles
2001 singles
Tag Team (group) songs
Clock (dance act) songs
Pop-rap songs
MCA Records singles
ZYX Music singles